The Sunrise balloon-borne solar observatory consists of a 1m aperture Gregory telescope, a UV filter imager, an imaging vector polarimeter, an image stabilization
system and further infrastructure. The first science flight of Sunrise yielded high-quality data that reveal the structure, dynamics and evolution of solar convection, oscillations and magnetic fields at a resolution of around 100 km in the quiet Sun.

Overview
The strong absorption of UV radiation by the Earth's atmosphere makes it challenging to carry out ground-based observations at these wavelengths. A balloon mission reaching altitudes of above 30 km benefits from a reduction of UV absorption by 99%, making engineering solutions for the telescope easier. The launch site was in the arctic region to make uninterrupted observation of the Sun over several days possible. The telescope has a 1 metre primary mirror that directs the 1 kW of solar radiation to the first focal point where 99% of the radiation is reflected out of the telescope, the remaining light is transferred into several instruments.

The one metre diameter primary mirror is made from a  glass ceramic zerodur, it is the central part of the gondola of nearly 2 tons. Solar panels of 1.5 kW output power are used to power the onboard equipment and a hard disk array of 2 x 2.4 Terabyte is used to store the data during flight.

Instruments
CWS, Correlating Wavefront Sensor is a CCD camera with 1 kHz read-outs responsible generate the images necessary for image stabilization and proper alignment.
SUFI, Sunrise Filter Imager observes the sun in five distinct wavelengths 214, 300, 312, 388 and 397 nm, on a 2048 x 2048 pixel CCD, through a filter wheele.
IMaX, Imaging Magnetograph eXperiment observes the Zeeman splitting of the iron line (FeI) around 525 nm. The observed field of view is 50 x 50 arcseconds.

Flights
 Sunrise's first flight was launched at 8:05 8 June 2009 local time from Esrange, near Kiruna, Sweden and it landed 1:45 14 June 2009 local time on Somerset Island, Nunavut, northern Canada after a flight duration nearly six days.
 Sunrise's second flight was launched at 7:38 (5:38 UTC) on 12 June 2013 from Esrange, near Kiruna, Sweden, and it landed afternoon 17 June 2013 on Boothia peninsula, Nunavut, northern Canada after a flight duration of over 5 days.
 Sunrise's third flight is scheduled for July 2022 from Esrange, near Kiruna, Sweden,.  The third edition of sunrise is a step forward in terms of onboard instrumentation, with three new instruments, SUSI, SCIP, and TuMAG.

See also
List of solar telescopes
Hinode
Swedish Solar Telescope

References

External links
 Sunrise website at MPG.de
 Sunrise website at GWDG.de
 Sunrise science blog
 October 2007 engineering test flight account by StratoCat
 Video of the launch from Esrange in 2009, part 1 and part 2.

Balloon-borne telescopes
Solar telescopes
Ultraviolet telescopes